Heterothrips is a genus of thrips in the family Heterothripidae. There are more than 60 described species in Heterothrips.

Species
These 64 species belong to the genus Heterothrips:

 Heterothrips aesculi Watson, 1915
 Heterothrips albipennis
 Heterothrips analis Hood, 1915
 Heterothrips angusticeps Hood
 Heterothrips arisaemae Hood, 1908
 Heterothrips auranticornis Watson, 1922
 Heterothrips australis
 Heterothrips azaleae Hood, 1916
 Heterothrips bicolor Hood
 Heterothrips borinquen Hood
 Heterothrips brasiliensis Moulton
 Heterothrips cacti Hood
 Heterothrips clusiae Hood
 Heterothrips condei Moulton
 Heterothrips cuernavacae Watson
 Heterothrips decacornis D.L.Crawford, 1909
 Heterothrips decoratus Hood
 Heterothrips eversi Stannard, 1958
 Heterothrips fimbriatus Hood
 Heterothrips flavicornis Hood
 Heterothrips flavidus Hood
 Heterothrips flavitibia Moulton, 1932
 Heterothrips gillettei Moulton, 1929
 Heterothrips hondurensis Retana-Salazar, 2009
 Heterothrips lankesteriensis Retana Salazar, 2009
 Heterothrips lasquerellae Hood, 1939
 Heterothrips limbatus Hood, 1925
 Heterothrips lyoniae Hood, 1916
 Heterothrips marginatus Hood
 Heterothrips mexicanus Watson
 Heterothrips miconiae Hood
 Heterothrips minor Hood
 Heterothrips moestus De Santis, 1966
 Heterothrips myrceugenellae Gallego, 1973
 Heterothrips nouragensis Ulitzka, 2004
 Heterothrips nouraguensis Ulitzka, 2004
 Heterothrips nudus Moulton
 Heterothrips obscurus
 Heterothrips ornatus Hood
 Heterothrips paulistarum
 Heterothrips pectinifer Hood, 1915
 Heterothrips pedicellatus
 Heterothrips peixotoa Del-Claro, Marullo & Mound, 1997
 Heterothrips peruvianus Hood
 Heterothrips pilarae
 Heterothrips prosopidis J.C.Crawford, 1943
 Heterothrips pubescens Hood
 Heterothrips quercicola J.C.Crawford, 1942
 Heterothrips salicis Shull, 1909
 Heterothrips sanctaecatharinae
 Heterothrips savanicus
 Heterothrips selici
 Heterothrips sericatus Hood, 1913
 Heterothrips spinosus Moulton
 Heterothrips stellae
 Heterothrips striatus Moulton
 Heterothrips trinidadensis Hood
 Heterothrips varitibia Moulton
 Heterothrips vernus Hood, 1939
 Heterothrips vitifloridus Bailey & Cott, 1954
 Heterothrips vitis Hood, 1916
 Heterothrips watsoni Bailey & Cott, 1954
 Heterothrips xolismae Hood, 1936
 † Heterothrips nani Schliephake, 2001

References

Further reading

 
 
 
 

Thrips
Articles created by Qbugbot